William H. Harris, is an American orthopaedic surgeon, Founder and Director Emeritus of the Massachusetts General Hospital Harris Orthopaedics Laboratory, and creator of the Advances in Arthroplasty course held annually since 1970.

Much of Harris' research focuses on osteolysis, the deterioration of bone tissue around joint replacement implants, and developing highly cross-linked polyethylene to counter the issue of osteolysis. Fifteen years of wide spread use of highly cross-linked polyethylene in patients have shown it to be very effective in preventing osteolysis. Harris is also recognized for performing the world's first successful total hip replacement in a patient with a total congenital dislocation of the hip and for developing the first effective cement-free acetabular component.

In addition, Harris is known for developing the Harris Hip Score which rates a patient's progress on pain and function following surgery. His work inspired surgical techniques, implant design, development of new operations, prevention of blood clot formation, and other leading advances in hip surgery.

Early life and education
Harris was born in 1927 in Great Falls, Montana and raised in Harrisburg, Pennsylvania. He received his B.S. from Haverford College in 1947 with High Honors and his M.D. from Perelman School of Medicine at the University of Pennsylvania in 1951. Harris interned at the Hospital of the University of Pennsylvania and completed a one-year general surgery residency there.

Career 
He completed orthopedic training at the Boston Children's Hospital and Massachusetts General Hospital.

Harris performed one of the first femoral head autograft procedures and one of the first femoral head allograft procedures: two techniques that are now widely used. Along with his research staff at Massachusetts General Hospital, Harris was the first to centrifuge cement. The Total System, introduced in 1983, was designed by Harris and was the first integrated system offering an entire range of cemented and cementless implants.

Harris was one of the two designers to create the first successful cementless acetabular component. This was the first time screws were put through the acetabular component to fix it to the skeleton. He is also the designer of one of the most successful long-term cemented femoral components.

Harris was Chief of the Adult Reconstructive Surgery and Director of the Harris Orthopedic Laboratory of the Massachusetts General Hospital. He has been Clinical Professor of Orthopedic Surgery at the Harvard Medical School since 1974 and was awarded the Alan Gerry Chair as Clinical Professor of Orthopedic Surgery at Harvard Medical School in 1997.

Harris is a founding member of The Hip Society of North America and served as the organization's first president. He went on to be a founding member and president of the International Hip Society. The Hip Society granted Dr. Harris a record ten honorary awards for outstanding contributions to hip surgery, and he has twice won the Kappa Delta Award of the American Academy of Orthopedic Surgeons for outstanding orthopedic research. Dr. Harris is the author of some 520 scientific publications and three textbooks dealing with hip surgery, arthritis and diseases of the skeleton.

Honors and awards
 Two Kappa Delta Awards
 10 awards from the Hip Society
 The Lifetime Achievement Award from the Hip Society
 Lifetime Achievement Award from the Muller Foundation
 Lifetime Achievement Award of the International Hip Society

Publications
Partial list:

References

1927 births
Living people
Harvard Medical School faculty
Perelman School of Medicine at the University of Pennsylvania alumni
Haverford College alumni
American orthopedic surgeons